Bupkis is an upcoming action comedy television series. It is due to premiere on Peacock.

Premise
The show is described as a "heightened fictionalized version of Pete Davidson's life.”

Cast

Main
 Pete Davidson
 Edie Falco
 Joe Pesci

Guest
 Charlie Day
 Ray Romano
 Kenan Thompson
 Brad Garrett
 Chase Sui Wonders
 Simon Rex
 Shane Gillis

Production
The series was first announced in March 2022, with Pete Davidson developing the series alongside Judah Miller and Dave Sirus. Davidson was also set to star. The series was given a greenlight by Peacock in April. The following, Edie Falco was announced to play Davidson's mother in the series. In August, Joe Pesci was added to the cast as Davidson's grandfather. This will be Pesci's first time starring in a television series in 37 years.

Filming for the series began by October 2022, with a first look image of Davidson and Pesci released by Peacock.

References

Peacock (streaming service) original programming
American action comedy television series
Television series by Broadway Video
Television series by Universal Television